Old Lutheran Church or Old Lutheran may refer to:

 Old Apostolic Lutheran Church, of America
 Old Lutheran Parsonage,  a historic Lutheran church in Schoharie, Schoharie County, New York
 Old Lutherans, German Lutherans in the Kingdom of Prussia
 Independent Lutheran Diocese, founded as Old Lutheran Church in America
 Klemzig, South Australia#Background, Old Lutheran settlement